Michael McGrath (born August 22, 1947) is an American lawyer and judge who has served as the chief justice of the Montana Supreme Court since 2009. He was elected in 2008. He also served as the Attorney General of Montana from 2000 to 2008. He is a veteran of the United States Air Force.

Early life and education
A native of Butte, Montana, McGrath graduated from the University of Montana with a Bachelor of Arts in business administration in 1970 and received his Juris Doctor from Gonzaga University School of Law in 1975.  He is the recipient of the 2021 Gonzaga Law Medal.

Legal career
He was a Reginald Heber Smith Community Lawyer Fellow in Reno, Nevada from 1975 to 1976, and Montana's Assistant Attorney General from 1976 to 1982.

He served as County Attorney for Lewis and Clark County for five terms spanning 1982 to 2000. In his eighteen years as a prosecutor, McGrath focused on family violence issues, including domestic abuse and sexual assault of children. He ran for Governor of Montana in 1992, but lost in the Democratic primary to former State Representative Dorothy Bradley, who in turn lost the general election to Marc Racicot.

He is a former chair of the Conference of Western Attorneys General and served as president of the Montana County Attorneys' Association.

Personal life
He and his wife Joy have two sons and five grandchildren.

See also

Baxter v. Montana

References

  Chief Justice Mike McGrath Biography
  Mike McGrath (MT)] at Project Vote Smart 
 Montana Department of Justice Wikipedia article on McGrath term start/end dates

|-

1947 births
Living people
21st-century American lawyers
21st-century American judges
Chief Justices of the Montana Supreme Court
Gonzaga University School of Law alumni
Montana Attorneys General
Montana Democrats
Politicians from Butte, Montana
United States Air Force officers
University of Montana alumni